Amphetamine is a stimulant drug.

Amphetamine may also refer to:

Chemicals
 Substituted amphetamine, a class of chemical compounds based upon the amphetamine structure
 Dextroamphetamine (dexamfetamine, (D)-amphetamine), the drug's dextrorotatory enantiomer
 Levoamphetamine (levamfetamine, (L)-amphetamine), the drug's levorotatory enantiomer
 Adderall, a brand of mixed amphetamine salts
 Lisdexamfetamine, a prodrug of dextroamphetamine marketed under the brand name Vyvanse

Entertainment
 Amphetamine (film), a 2010 Hong Kong film
 Amphetamine Reptile Records, an American record label
 "Amphetamine", a song by Everclear from So Much for the Afterglow

See also
 History and culture of amphetamines